Matchwitz is a 1970 Milton Bradley Company version of the classic nim game, presented in a green tray. The game is for players age eight to adult.

Gameplay
First ensure that all pins are exposed on one side of the board. Pins are in 3 rows.  Top row has 7 pins, middle row has 5 pins, and the bottom row has 3 pins.  Players alternate taking turns.  In each turn a player may push down any number of pegs in a single row (they can't play in more than one row at a time). The player forced to push down the last remaining peg loses the game.

References

External links

Board games introduced in 1970
Milton Bradley Company games